Superscripts and Subscripts is a Unicode block containing superscript and subscript numerals, mathematical operators, and letters used in mathematics and phonetics. The use of subscripts and superscripts in Unicode allows any polynomial, chemical and certain other equations to be represented in plain text without using any form of markup like HTML or TeX. Other superscript letters can be found in the Spacing Modifier Letters, Phonetic Extensions and Phonetic Extensions Supplement blocks, while the superscript 1, 2, and 3, inherited from ISO 8859-1, were included in the Latin-1 Supplement block.

Block

History
The following Unicode-related documents record the purpose and process of defining specific characters in the Superscripts and Subscripts block:

See also 
 Unicode superscripts and subscripts 
 Phonetic symbols in Unicode
 Latin script in Unicode

References 

Unicode blocks